Major Richard William George Hingston    (17 January 1887 – 5 August 1966) was an Irish physician, explorer and naturalist who worked in India with the Indian Medical Service. He wrote several books based on his travels and natural history observations.

Early life
Hingston was the son of Rev. Richard Edward Hull Kingston (1859–1883), of Aglish, County Waterford, and Frances Sandiford. Most of his early life was spent in the family home at Horsehead in Passage West, County Cork.

He was educated at Merchant Taylors' School and at University College Cork. He graduated from the National University of Ireland with first-class honours in 1910, and almost immediately obtained a position in the Indian Medical Service. He secured second place in the I.M.S. examination, among the eminent group which included T. A. Hughes, the physiologist, Clive Newcomb, the research chemist, and Henry Shortt, the parasitologist.

In 1913, he was seconded from military duty as naturalist to the Indo-Russian Pamir triangulation expedition. In 1914 he went on war service and saw action in East Africa, France, Mesopotamia, and the N.W. Frontier, gaining two mentions in dispatches and the Military Cross for gallantry in action.

Naturalist and author
In 1920 he published a book detailing his 1914 & 1916 travels in the Himalayan valley of Hazara, in what is now Pakistan, entitled A Naturalist in Himalaya. He was elected to the Royal Geographical Society on 22 June 1922, proposed by Lt.-Col. Williamson Oswald and seconded by John Scott Keltie.

In 1924, he was appointed medical officer and naturalist to the Mount Everest Expedition, although he was not a mountaineer by profession but rather a doctor and naturalist. As a naturalist he collected 10,000 animal samples (insects for the largest part), and 500 plant specimens during the 1924 expedition. Among his finds were a species of spider he discovered living at 22,000 feet (later named as Euophrys omnisuperstes), the highest known habitat for any animal. There he also studied and later published his findings on the effects of high altitudes on the human body in Physiological Difficulties in the Ascent of Mount Everest, published in The Alpine Journal (1925).

Despite his lack of official climbing skills, Hingston was able to come to the aid of Edward Norton at Camp IV when Norton was struck by snow blindness.

From 1925 till 1927, he acted as surgeon-naturalist to the Marine Survey of India on H.I.M.S. Investigator. This post enabled him to conduct new and innovative research which provided rich fields of scientific treasure for several I.M.S. officers such as Alcock and Sewell.

Hingston retired from the Indian Medical Service on pension in 1927. He immediately joined the Oxford University expedition to Greenland. In the following year he took command of an expedition sent by the same university to British Guiana. His account of the expedition was published in his book A naturalist in the Guiana forest in (1932). He subsequently undertook a mission to Rhodesia, Nyasaland, Kenya, Uganda, and Tanganyika to investigate the methods of preserving the indigenous fauna.

He was recalled to military duty in India in 1939, and remained there until 1946. After the second world war, Hingston retired to his home in Passage West, County Cork.

He wrote copiously, attractively, and accurately. Although most of his work appeared in scientific journals, he had a number of books to his credit. Most of the specimens he collected are housed at The Natural History Museum in London.

Books

A naturalist in the Himalaya (London: Witherby, 1920), he told of the spiders, ants, and butterflies of the high valleys;
A naturalist in Hindustan (London: Witherby, 1923) detailed the lesser fauna of the plains of the United Provinces. 
Problems of Instinct and Intelligence (London: Arnold, 1928).
The Meaning of Animal Colour and Adornment (London: Arnold, 1933). 
 Darwin (Great Lives) (London: Duckworth, 1934). 
He also contributed to 
Norton, E.F.  The Fight for Everest : 1924 London: Arnold, 1925.

Arms

References

External links
 A Naturalist in the Himalaya (1920) (Scanned book)

1887 births
1966 deaths
20th-century Irish medical doctors
British entomologists
Coleopterists
Indian Medical Service officers
Fellows of the Royal Geographical Society
Indian Army personnel of World War I
Recipients of the Military Cross
20th-century Irish zoologists